The Old Gold & Black is the student-run newspaper of Wake Forest University, named after the school's colors.  The newspaper was founded in 1916 and is published every other Thursday with the exception of school holidays and exam weeks. The Old Gold & Black office is located on the fifth floor of the Benson University Center on Wake Forest's main campus.

The newspaper is Wake Forest University's only student newspaper and serves as the printed history of the university. It comprises five main sections: news, features, opinion, sports and life. Each section is managed by an editor and assistant editors. They are all under the leadership of an editor-in-chief and managing editors for print and online. The editor-in-chief works alongside the business manager who is in charge of the budget, advertising revenue, and payroll. These editors form the editorial board which meets weekly to discuss campus issues, compose an editorial and decide on the paper's content. Among ACC student newspapers, the Old Gold & Black is the only paper that pays all writers and staff members.

The staff's advisor, Phoebe Zerwick, assists the staff and offers advice and counsel on important editorial decisions. These editors form the editorial board which meets weekly to discuss campus issues, compose a left-hand editorial and decide on the paper's content.

The Old Gold & Black employs graphic designers, production assistants, photographers and staff writers.  The majority of positions at the Old Gold & Black are paid, though a new writer must submit three articles for publication in order to receive pay and become a staff writer. The Old Gold & Black consistently employs a total staff of over 100 members, the majority of them writers.

The Old Gold & Black is a newspaper that has placed many times at Associated Collegiate Press conferences.

Recent awards

The Old Gold & Black has received a number of Associated Collegiate Press awards: 
At the Fall 2013 ACP conference, the Old Gold & Black won a Pacemaker Award in the category of "Website Enrollment Level 1" and was a finalist for the Pacemaker Award for print. The OGB also won a Best in Show Award for "Website Enrollment Level 1" at the Fall 2013 ACP conference.
At the Fall 2012 ACP conference, the Old Gold & Black was awarded fourth place in the category of "Website Enrollment Level 1".
At the Spring 2011 ACP conference, the Old Gold & Black was awarded seventh place in the category of "small college website".
At the 2008 ACP conference, the Old Gold & Black was awarded third place in the "Best in Show: 4-year college weekly broadsheet" category.  Also, the newspaper's web site, was awarded 10th place in the category of newspaper website.
At the 2007 ACP conference, the Old Gold & Black was awarded second place in the "Best in Show: 4-year college weekly broadsheet" category.
In 2006, the Old Gold & Black took home third place in the "Newspaper of the Year: 4-year colleges-Weekly Broadsheet" category.
At the 2005 ACP awards, the Old Gold & Black received third place in the "Best in Show: 4-year colleges-weekly broadsheet" category.
At the 2002 ACP Conference, the newspaper received third place in the "Best in Show: Four-year college" category. 
In 2001, Old Gold & Black reporters Sabrina Parker and Jordan Wagner received first place in the "Story of the Year: Diversity" category. 
In 1963, the Old Gold & Black received the American Newspaper Publishers Association "peacemaker" award, the highest national honors in the field of journalism.

The Old Gold & Black has won the ACP's "preeminent" Pacemaker award twice: in 2001, and in 2004, its Online Pacemaker Award.

Former managing editor Lisa Hoppenjans and former managing editor Jae Haley have both received the Jim Murray Scholarship Award, a national award for excellence in sports writing at the college level.

Former editorial cartoonist William Warren was the first-place winner of the 2006 John Locher Memorial Award.

Marks on Wake Forest history
The Old Gold & Black is responsible for naming the Wake Forest mascot, the Demon Deacon. In 1923, the Wake Forest American football team defeated rival Duke University. In the following issue of the Old Gold and Black, sports editor Mayon Parker (1924 Wake Forest graduate) first referred to the team as "Demon Deacons," in recognition of what he called their "devilish" play and fighting spirit. Henry Belk, Wake Forest's news director, and Hank Garrity, the coach who led the team to their victory, liked the title and used it often, so the name stuck.

Due to pressure from the Baptist State Convention in the late 1930s, the college began to take a strong stance against student dancing. The decision and subsequent enforcement was harshly criticized by the editorial board of the Old Gold & Black. In the February 4, 1939 issue, the editorial board argued that "Despite the objection of some few blue-nosed and narrow-minded powers-that-be, you can't stop Wake Forest students from dancing. It would work wonders for the morale of the school as a whole." This lobbying on behalf of social organizations is credited with the eventual founding of national fraternities and sororities at Wake Forest.

Controversies 
In October 1962, the High Point Central Baptist Association censured the Old Gold & Black for running an advertisement featuring a student mixing an alcoholic beverage in his dorm room. The controversy of the advertisement was part of ongoing tensions between university leadership and the Baptist State Convention. In response to the censure, university officials promised to Baptist board members that the ads would not reappear.

In December 1989, Tim Bell, a Wake Forest student studying abroad in China, was found guilty by the Honor Council of deceiving his professors who were chaperoning the trip. Bell had secretly filmed parts of the Tiananmen Square massacre and then smuggled them out of the country. Public opinion on campus was mixed following the conviction; some felt he acted heroically while others thought he was selfish for endangering the rest of the students on the trip. Nevertheless, in an editorial the Old Gold & Black defended Bell's actions and criticized the Honor Council for procedural errors. Eventually, Bell's conviction was overturned.

In March 2000, the Old Gold & Black published an anti-Semitic advertising insert entitled "The Revisionist." The Editorial Staff realized its error later that day, and issued a public apology. The Resident Student Association sponsored a forum where the issue was discussed. President Thomas Hearn issued a powerful public statement uniting the campus community against the hatred represented in the insert and creating a schedule of Holocaust-related speakers and events for the following semesters. Furthermore, the advertising manager wrote an op-ed piece regretting her mistake and taking full responsibility. She announced that the proceeds of the advertisement would be donated to a local Holocaust Center. As a result of the insert, a formal advertising policy was established and goals were set to improve
communication between the editorial and business offices.

Special publications
The Old Gold & Black publishes a freshman tabloid the week before classes. The tabloid informs freshman about all aspects of the school from academics, to exploring the social scene, to athletics.

Beginning in 2007, the Old Gold & Black published an annual graduation tabloid profiling seniors who have excelled in their respective major. Each department nominates an outstanding senior to be featured in this issue. The "grad tab" is published in early May in order to be distributed during Commencement weekend events.

The Old Gold & Black publishes a basketball preview insert each year. Basketball is one of the most popular sports at Wake Forest and each year's insert includes player and coach profiles and interviews, along with a brief look at the other ACC teams.

Every April the Old Gold & Black interviews Student Government candidates for Secretary, Speaker of House, Treasurer and President. Following consultation with the editorial board, the paper endorses one or multiple candidates for each position.

Until 2012, the Old Gold & Black published an April Fool's edition. Past April Fool's mastheads include Sweat Mold & Plaque, I Sold my Soul for Crack and OGBYN. The issue is produced by senior editors and includes spoof articles, columns and humorous staff photos. The 'OGBYN' made a comeback in April of 2021.

In 2015 the Old Gold & Black dedicated its September 29 edition to honoring the life and career of Arnold Palmer, following his passing earlier in the week.

Executive Staff
The four people most responsible for the day-to-day operations of the paper are the Editor-in-Chief, the Business Manager, and the Print, Online, and Multimedia Managing Editors. The incoming Business Manager and Editor-in-Chief are selected by their predecessors after consultation with the Faculty Adviser and other members of the Editorial Board. The outgoing editor-in-chief also selects the following year's managing editors.

There were two editors in the 1989 school year because editor Jonathan Jordan ran for a seat in the 39th District of the North Carolina House of Representatives. He would lose the race and resign his position to catch up on his school work. Alan Pringle would take his post.

Notable alumni
L.T. Stallings '16, playwright and screenwriter, worked on the Old Gold & Black when it was a literary magazine.
W. J. Cash '22, author of The Mind of the South, served as editor of the Old Gold & Black while an undergraduate at Wake Forest.
Edwin Wilson '23, former professor, provost and vice president of Wake Forest, wrote for the Old Gold & Black his senior year at Wake Forest.
Graham Martin Jr. '32, U.S. Ambassador to Thailand, Italy and South Vietnam, was a managing editor of the Old Gold & Black as a student.
Shearon Davis '35, prominent businessman, former chairman of the North Carolina Chamber of Commerce, and namesake for the Shearon Harris Nuclear Power Plant was a managing editor as a student.
David Britt '37, a Justice of the North Carolina Supreme Court, served as the business manager of the Old Gold & Black as a student. 
Jesse Helms, a U.S. Senator from 1973–2003, was a sports reporter for the Old Gold & Black before dropping out to take a job at the Raleigh Times.
Bynum Shaw '48, author and former reporter for the Baltimore Sun, worked as the editor of the Old Gold & Black as a student at Wake Forest.
Al Hunt '65, former writer for the Wall Street Journal and current Washington managing editor for Bloomberg News, was an Old Gold & Black staff member.
Linda Carter Brinson '69, journalist and first woman assistant national editor at The Baltimore Sun, served as editor of the Old Gold & Black while an undergraduate student.
Maria Henson '82, who won the 1992 Pulitzer Prize for Editorial Writing, served as a copy editor of the Old Gold & Black as an undergraduate.
Louise Flanagan '84, a U.S. District Judge, was a section editor of the Old Gold & Black as a student. 
Tom Ondrof '86, the current CFO of Aramark, served as a sports editor of the Old Gold & Black while studying at Wake Forest.
Jonathan Jordan '90, an attorney and politician who served in the North Carolina House of Representatives, was editor-in-chief of the Old Gold & Black.
Britt Grant '00, a U.S. Circuit Court Judge, wrote for the Old Gold & Black as an undergraduate.
Ricky Van Veen '03, co-founder of the website CollegeHumor, was a photographer and reporter for the Old Gold & Black while a student. 
Zachary Klein '04, co-founder of Vimeo, was one of the first Online Managing Editors of the Old Gold & Black.
Jordan Rae Kelly '05, the former director for cyber incident response on the National Security Council at the White House, wrote for the Old Gold & Black as an undergraduate.

External links
Official website
The Old Gold and Black on Facebook
The Old Gold and Black on Twitter
Old Gold and Black, digital collection of issues from 1916–2000 at the Z. Smith Reynolds Library, Wake Forest University

References

Wake Forest University
Student newspapers published in North Carolina
Publications established in 1916
1916 establishments in North Carolina
Mass media in Winston-Salem, North Carolina